

Emerald Peak is a  mountain summit located in Yoho National Park, in the Canadian Rockies of British Columbia, Canada. Its nearest higher peak is Mount Carnarvon,  to the northwest. Both are part of the President Range which is a subset of the Waputik Mountains. The mountain's name was officially adopted in 1924 when approved by the Geographical Names Board of Canada, in association with Emerald Lake, which in turn was named in 1900 on account of its color.

Geology

Emerald Peak is composed of sedimentary rock laid down during the Cambrian period. Formed in shallow seas, this sedimentary rock was pushed east and over the top of younger rock during the Laramide orogeny.

Climate

Based on the Köppen climate classification, Emerald Peak is located in a subarctic climate with cold, snowy winters, and mild summers. The months July through September offer the most favorable weather for viewing or climbing Emerald Peak.

See also

Geography of British Columbia

References

External links
 Weather: Emerald Peak
Parks Canada web site: Yoho National Park
Emerald Peak climbing photos: On-Top

Two-thousanders of British Columbia
Canadian Rockies
Mountains of Yoho National Park
Kootenay Land District